Quorn Football Club is an English football club based in the village of Quorn, near Loughborough, Leicestershire, currently playing in the United Counties League Premier Division North.

History

The club was founded in 1924 by attendees of the local Wesleyan Chapel and accordingly was named Quorn Methodists F.C., changing its name in 1952. In 1937 the club joined the Leicestershire Senior League. Immediately after World War II they played in the Central Division, and then from 1948 in Division 2 after a league re-organisation. Quorn won this division in 1950 and then followed up by winning the first division the following season.

Over the next fifty years the club moved up and down between the divisions on four occasions, finally cementing their place in the renamed Premier Division in the late 1990s, before claiming the league title, and with it promotion to the Midland Alliance in 2001.

In 2003 the club was the only one at its level to sell a player to a Football League team, when Luke Varney moved to Crewe Alexandra for £50,000. 

In the 2006–07 season they finished 3rd in the Midland Alliance and, due to the expansion of the Northern Premier League First Division into two regional divisions, were therefore accepted into the Northern Premier League Division One South. In May 2007 the club received a £500000 windfall after Luke Varney's £2,000,000 move from Crewe to Charlton Athletic.

In 2011 Quorn won the Westerby Cup for the first time with a 5–4 victory over Hinckley United at Walkers Stadium under the management of Lawrie Dudfield, but were relegated from the Northern Premier League Division One South during the same season.

John Folwell was appointed as their new manager in May 2013, joining from local rivals Barrow Town. He resigned in January 2015 due to disagreements with the chairman. Two time former manager Dougie Keast was agreed to take over until the end of the 2014–15 season.

Dougie Keast remained at the helm until December 2017, when former Hinckley AFC manager Carl Abbott was appointed, joining the club from Northern Premier Division Market Drayton Town.

On Wednesday 8 May 2019 - Carl Abbott left Quorn AFC to join Evesham United FC.

Following the COVID-19 outbreak, the 2019/2020 playing season was expunged. Quorn was in first place in the United Counties league (Step 5) when the football season was terminated on 16 March 2020.

Former Burton Albion and Scunthorpe United midfielder Cleveland Taylor was appointed as the first team manager on 1 May 2020. He left the club on 14 October 2021.

Recent managerial history

 Bob Steel (?–2002)
 Dougie Keast (2002–2006)
 Marcus Law (2006–2007)
 Peter McGurk (2007–2008)
 Gavin O'Toole (2008–2009)
 Dougie Keast (2009–2011)
 Lawrie Dudfield (2011–2012)
 Craig Armstrong (2012)
 Tommy Brookbanks (2012)
 John Folwell (2013–2015)
 Dougie Keast (2015–2017)
 Carl Abbott (2017–2019)
 Martin Carruthers (May 2019 - Nov 2019)
 Willis Francis (Nov 2019 - February 2020)
 Russell Hoult (February 2020 to April 2020)
 Cleveland Taylor (May 2021 to October 2021)

Ground

Farley Way Stadium boasts a 400-seater cantilever stand running along one side of the pitch and a covered terrace at one end. Car parking is available on the ground and there is also a clubhouse where food and drink are available on match days. Previously the club had played at Warwick Avenue since 1960 but moved out after selling their ground at that site to the Abbeyfield housing association.

Rivalries
Quorn's main rivals include Shepshed Dynamo and Loughborough Dynamo of the Northern Premier League Division One South and Barrow Town, the closest senior club to Quorn geographically.

Current squad

Club records
Best league performance: Northern Premier League Division One South, 12th, 2008–09
Best FA Cup performance: Third Qualifying Round, 2006–07
Best FA Vase performance: 4th round, 2004–05 and 2006–07

References

Sources

 
Quorn FC on the official village website

External links
Official Site

 
Football clubs in England
Leicestershire Senior League
Northern Premier League clubs
Football clubs in Leicestershire
1924 establishments in England
Association football clubs established in 1924
Midland Football League
United Counties League
Midland Football Alliance